Luis Mayans y Enríquez de Navarra (22 July 1805 in Requena, Valencia – 14 September 1880 in Madrid) was a Spanish noble and politician who served as Minister of State in 1854 and President of the Congress of Deputies between 1848 and 1852.

|-

Foreign ministers of Spain
Presidents of the Congress of Deputies (Spain)
1805 births
1880 deaths
Moderate Party (Spain) politicians
19th-century Spanish politicians